Pseudocrates is a genus of moth in the family Lecithoceridae.

Species
 Pseudocrates antisphena Meyrick, 1918
 Pseudocrates soritica Meyrick, 1918

References

Lecithocerinae
Taxa named by Edward Meyrick
Moth genera